Dalla dimidiatus is a species of butterfly in the family Hesperiidae. It is found in Colombia, Venezuela and Peru.

Subspecies
Dalla dimidiatus dimidiatus - Colombia, Venezuela
Dalla dimidiatus lilla Evans, 1955 - Peru
Dalla dimidiatus pucer Evans, 1955 - Peru

References

Butterflies described in 1867
dimidiatus
Hesperiidae of South America
Taxa named by Baron Cajetan von Felder
Taxa named by Rudolf Felder